Nokogiri is an open source software library to parse HTML and XML in Ruby.  It depends on libxml2 and libxslt to provide its functionality.

Overview

It markets itself as providing a sensible, easy-to-understand API for reading, writing, modifying, and querying documents. It is available for ruby as well as java through Jruby.
It provides fast and standards-compliant parser by relying on native parsers like libxml2 (CRuby) and xerces (JRuby).

It is one of the most downloaded Ruby gems, having been downloaded over 550 million times from the rubygems.org repository.

Features

 DOM Parser for XML, HTML4, and HTML5
 SAX Parser for XML and HTML4
 Push Parser for XML and HTML4
 Document search via XPath 1.0
 Document search via CSS3 selectors
 XSD Schema validation
 XSLT transformation
 XML and HTML Builder

Enterprise support is available through tidelift, a paid subscription model, offering commercial support for open source applications.

References

External links
 
 

Ruby (programming language)
XML parsers
HTML parsers
Web scraping